Callipogon is a genus of beetles belonging to the family Cerambycidae. Its closest relatives are the genera Enoplocerus, Ergates and Trichocnemis, with divergence from these lineages estimated to the Cretaceous about 80 million years ago. Most species are found in the Neotropics, with Callipogon relictus being the only palearctic species.

Species
The following species are recognised in the genus Callipogon:
 Callipogon barbatum (Fabricius, 1781)
 Callipogon barbiflavum Chevrolat, 1864
 Callipogon beckeri Lameere, 1904
 Callipogon lemoinei Reiche, 1840
 Callipogon levchenkoi Skrylnik 2020
 Callipogon limonovi Titarenko 2017
 Callipogon proletarium Lameere, 1904
 Callipogon senex Dupont, 1832
 Callipogon sericeum (Olivier, 1795)
 Callipogon relictus Semenov, 1899

References

 Biolib

Prioninae